Dayanna Grageda (born 5 March 1992) is a Bolivian-Australian  environmental advocate, model and beauty queen who was crowned Miss Earth Australia 2015 and later that year won the international title of Miss Earth Air 2015. Dayanna holds the highest recorded placement for both an Australian and an ethnically Bolivian beauty queen in Miss Earth history.

Miss Earth 2015
Dayanna joined the Miss Earth Australia pageant in 2015 and won the national Australian title of Miss Earth Australia 2015. She then went onto compete in the international Miss Earth 2015 pageant held in Vienna, Austria on 5 December 2015. Dayanna beat 85 international queens and was crowned Miss Earth Air 2015 and joined the Miss Earth elemental court, working alongside Miss Earth 2015, Angelina Ong. Dayanna's second placement is record breaking and she currently stands as holding the highest recorded placement for both an Australian and for an ethnically Bolivian beauty queen in Miss Earth history.

References

Miss Earth 2015 contestants
People from New South Wales
Australian beauty pageant winners
Bolivian emigrants to Australia
Australian people of Bolivian descent
Living people
1992 births